This is a list of state parks in the U.S. state of Vermont. Vermont state parks are managed by the Vermont Department of Forests, Parks and Recreation.

List of state parks in Vermont

Map of state parks in Vermont

See also

 List of Vermont state forests
 List of Vermont natural areas

External links

 Vermont State Parks
 Vermont Department of Forests, Parks and Recreation State Parks

 
State parks
Vermont state parks